The Former Residence of Xie juezai or Xie Juezai's Former Residence was the birthplace and childhood home of Xie Juezai, a Chinese politician who served as the President of the Supreme People's Court from 1959 to 1965.

History
The residence was built by Xie Juezai's ancestors in the 1st Year of Daoguang Emperor (1821–1850) in the Qing dynasty (1644–1911), namely 1821.

On April 26, 1883, in the ruling of Guangxu Emperor (1875–1908), Xie Juezai was born in here.

In 1997 it was listed as a Municipality-level Patriotic Education Base by the Propaganda Department of the Changsha Municipal Government.

In August 2000 it was classified as a Municipality Protected Historic Site.

On May 19, 2002, it was designated as a provincial level key cultural heritage.

In April 2004, during the 100th anniversary of the birth of Xie Juezai, the Government of Ningxiang renovated the residence and then it was officially opened to the public.

In 2013 it was listed as a "Historical and Cultural Sites Protected at the Provincial Level".

Access
The Former Residence of Xie Juezai open to visitors for free.

Surrounding area
Nearby attractions include the Former Residence of He Shuheng.

Gallery

References

Bibliography
 
 

Buildings and structures in Ningxiang
Traditional folk houses in Hunan
Tourist attractions in Changsha
Major National Historical and Cultural Sites in Hunan
1820s establishments in China